The Black Cultural Centre for Nova Scotia is located in Cherry Brook, Nova Scotia, in the Halifax Regional Municipality. The centre is a museum and a library resource centre that focuses on the history and culture of African Nova Scotians. The organization of the Black Cultural Society was incorporated as a charitable organization in 1977 and the centre opened its doors in 1983, with a goal to educate and inspire and to protect, preserve and promote Black culture in Nova Scotia. The centre is located on Trunk 7 at 1149 Main Street.

The centre holds many events on a weekly basis and is open to the public. The centre also has a permanent display about the former community of Africville.

Background
 The Black Cultural Centre was the "brainchild" of William Pearly Oliver   (1934 – 1989).  

By 2007, the Cultural Centre had been successful in acquiring an Order of Canada medal and thirty Victory Medals from eBay. The Victory Medals had been originally awarded to Black soldiers who had served during World War I in the No. 2 Construction Battalion—"Canada's first and only black battalion." The Centre worked with Dave Thomson of St. George, Ontario who had helped purchase medals for the Centre. In February 2007, the family of Sapper PR. P.F. Fenton learned that his medal was being auctioned on eBay. The community raised thousands of dollars towards the purchase price of over CDN$7,400 so the medal could be placed at the Centre.

Public transit
There is a Halifax Transit bus stop outside the Black Cultural Centre served by routes "61 North Preston" and "68 Cherry Brook". These operate all day and connect to nearby Portland Hills Terminal.

References

African-American museums in Canada
History of Black people in Canada
Culture of Nova Scotia
Buildings and structures in Halifax, Nova Scotia
Museums in Halifax, Nova Scotia
Black Canadian organizations